Rollout or Roll Out may refer to:

Arts and media
 Roll Out, a 1970s American sitcom
 "Rollout (My Business)", a song by Ludacris
 Rollout photography, a photographic process
 "Roll Out", a song by Labelle from Back to Now

Games and sports
 Rollout (backgammon), an analysis technique for backgammon positions and moves
 Rollout (poker), a game phase in certain poker variants
 Rollout, a play in American football in which a quarterback moves toward the sideline before attempting to pass

Science and technology
 Rollout (drag racing), acceleration measurement used in North America autosports
 Rollout/Rollin, a computer operating system memory management technique
 Rollout, stage of landing in which an aircraft decelerates on the runway
 Product launch or rollout, the introduction of a new product or service to market

See also
 Debut (disambiguation)